Tavileh-ye Yek (also Romanized as Ţavīleh-ye Yek) is a village in Hoveyzeh Rural District, in the Central District of Hoveyzeh County, Khuzestan Province, Iran. At the 2006 census, its population was 41, in 7 families.

References 

Populated places in Hoveyzeh County